Hubris is a 2017 Burmese drama television series. It aired on MRTV-4, from August 9 to September 13, 2017, on Mondays to Fridays at 19:15 for 25 episodes.

Cast
Zin Wine as U Htet Zaw
Ye Aung as U Moe Wai
Han Lin Thant as Lin Let
Hsaung Wutyee May as Kyway Kyway
May Mi Ko Ko as Thaw Thaw
La Pyae as Aung Maw
Lin Myat as Kyaw Kyaw
Thuta Aung as Myat Paing

References

Burmese television series
MRTV (TV network) original programming